Malcolm St. Clair  may refer to:

Malcolm St Clair (politician) (1927–2004), British farmer and Conservative Member of Parliament 1961–1963
Malcolm St. Clair (filmmaker) (1897–1952), Hollywood film director, writer, producer and actor